The North West Senior Cup is the most important provincial cricket knock-out cup of the North West jurisdiction in Ireland. The competition is open to teams playing in the North West Senior League. It is sponsored by Bank of Ireland and marketed as the Bank of Ireland Senior Cup.

The competition began in 1888 as the County Londonderry Senior Cup, with twelve clubs entering the first competition in which Limavady beat Donemana in the first final at St Columb's Court, Lone Moor Road, Derry.  The cup was organised on a league basis between 1894 and 1897, and there was no competition between 1898 and 1902. It became the North West Senior Cup in 2007.

List of winners

1880s

1890s

1900s

1910s

1920s

1930s

1940s

1950s

1960s

1970s

1980s

1990s

2000s

2010s

2020s

Summary of winners

See also
North West Senior League
Ulster Cup
NCU Senior Cup
Leinster Senior Cup

References

For past winners
Cricket Ireland Archives
Hiles, pp 362–373

External links
 North West of Ireland Cricket Union

Irish domestic cricket competitions
Cricket in Ulster